In United States constitutional law, the political question doctrine holds that a constitutional dispute that requires knowledge of a non-legal character or the use of techniques not suitable for a court or explicitly assigned by the Constitution to the U.S. Congress, or the President of the United States, lies within the political, rather than the legal, realm to solve, and judges customarily refuse to address such matters.  The idea of a political question is closely linked to the concept of justiciability, as it comes down to a question of whether or not the court system is an appropriate forum in which to hear the case.  This is because the court system only has the authority to hear and decide a legal question, not a political one.  Legal questions are deemed to be justiciable, while political questions are nonjusticiable. One scholar explained:

A ruling of nonjusticiability, in the end, prevents the issue that brought the case before the court from being resolved in a court of law. In the typical case where there is a finding of nonjusticiability due to the political question doctrine, the issue presented before the court is either so specific that the Constitution gives sole power to one of the political branches, or the issue presented is so vague that the Constitution does not even consider it.  A court can only decide issues based on the law.  The Constitution dictates the different legal responsibilities of each respective branch of government.  If there is an issue where the court does not have the Constitution as a guide, there are no legal criteria to use.  When there are no specific constitutional duties involved, the issue is to be decided through the democratic process.  The court will not engage in political disputes.

Origin
The doctrine has its roots in the historic Supreme Court case of Marbury v. Madison (1803).  In that case, Chief Justice John Marshall drew a distinction between two different functions of the U.S. Secretary of State. Marshall stated that when the Secretary of State was performing a purely discretionary matter, such as advising the President on matters of policy, he was not held to any legally identifiable standards. Therefore, some 
of the Secretary's actions are unable to be reviewed by a court of law. Marshall argued that Courts should generally not hear cases where political questions were involved and individual rights were not implicated (later versions of the political question doctrine argued that it applied even if individual rights were at stake).

Doctrine
Unlike the rules of standing, ripeness, and mootness, when the political question doctrine applies, a particular question is beyond judicial competence no matter who raises it, how immediate the interests it affects, or how burning the controversy. The doctrine is grounded in the principle of separation of powers, as well as the federal judiciary's desire to avoid inserting itself into conflicts between branches of the federal government. It is justified by the notion that there exist some questions best resolved through the political process, in which voters can approve or correct the challenged action by voting for or against those involved in the decision, or simply beyond judicial capability.

The leading Supreme Court case in the area of the political question doctrine is Baker v. Carr (1962). In that case, the Supreme Court held that an unequal apportionment of a state legislature may have denied equal protection and presented a justiciable issue. In the Baker opinion, the Court outlined six characteristics "[p]rominent on the surface of any case held to involve a political question," which include:

"a textually demonstrable constitutional commitment of the issue to a coordinate political department; or 
a lack of judicially discoverable and manageable standards for resolving it; or 
the impossibility of deciding without an initial policy determination of a kind clearly for nonjudicial discretion; or 
the impossibility of a court's undertaking independent resolution without expressing lack of the respect due coordinate branches of government; or 
an unusual need for unquestioning adherence to a political decision already made; or 
the potentiality of embarrassment from multifarious pronouncements by various departments on one question."

The first factor—a textually demonstrable commitment to another branch—is the classical view that the Court must decide all cases and issues before it unless, as a matter of constitutional interpretation, the Constitution itself has committed the determination of the issue to another branch of government. The second and third factors—lack of judicially discoverable standards and involvement of the judiciary in nonjudicial policy determinations—suggest a functional approach, based on practical considerations of how government ought to work. The final three factors—lack of respect for other branches, need for adherence to a political decision already made, and possibility of embarrassment—are based on the Court's prudential consideration against overexertion or aggrandizement.

Other applications
While the scope of the political question doctrine is still unsettled, its application has been mostly settled in a few decided areas. These areas are:

Guarantee Clause 
The Guarantee Clause, Article IV, Section 4, requires the federal government to "guarantee to every State in this Union a Republican Form of Government". The Supreme Court has ruled that this clause does not imply any set of "judicially manageable standards which a court could utilize independently in order to identify a State's lawful government". On this ground, the Court refused in Luther v. Borden to decide which group was the legitimate government of Rhode Island. Since then, the Court has consistently refused to resort to the Guarantee Clause as a constitutional source for invalidating state action, such as whether it is lawful for states to adopt laws through referendums.

Impeachment 
Article I, section 2 of the Constitution states that the House "shall have the sole power of Impeachment", and Article I, section 3 provides that the "Senate shall have the sole Power to try all Impeachments". Since the Constitution placed the sole power of impeachment in two political bodies, it is qualified as a political question. As a result, neither the decision of the House to impeach, nor of the Senate to remove a President or any other official, can be appealed to any court.

Foreign policy and war
A court will not usually decide if a treaty has been terminated because, on that issue, "governmental action ... must be regarded as of controlling importance".  However, courts sometimes do rule on the issue.  One example of this is native American tribes who have been officially terminated do not lose their treaty concessions without explicit text from Congress that the treaty is also abrogated.

In the case of bin Ali Jaber v. United States (2017), the plaintiffs filed a lawsuit under the Torture Victim Protection Act of 1991 after a 2012 U.S. drone strike killed five civilians. The District of Columbia Court of Appeals dismissed the plaintiffs' claims on the basis that the "plaintiffs challenged the type of executive decision found nonjusticiable in El-Shifa Pharmaceutical Industries Co. v. United States (2010)." In El-Shifa, the court distinguished "between claims questioning the wisdom of military action, 'a policy choice . . . constitutionally committed' to the political branches, and 'legal issues such as whether the government had legal authority to act.'" Thus, the court held that the plaintiffs' argument required the court to make a policy decision.

Gerrymandering 
There have been multiple cases on the justiciability of gerrymandering:
In the case of Davis v. Bandemer (1986), the Supreme Court held that gerrymandering cases were justiciable under the Equal Protection Clause. The precedential power of this case is still unclear, especially considering the later case of Rucho v. Common Cause.
 Vieth v. Jubelirer (2004) held claims of partisan gerrymandering nonjusticiable because a discernible and manageable standard for adjudicating them had not been established or applied since Davis v. Bandemer. However, Justice Kennedy stated in his concurring opinion that judicially manageable standards for gerrymandering could be developed in future cases.
Gill v. Whitford and Benisek v. Lamone (2017) were decided without taking a final stance on partisan gerrymandering. 
Rucho v. Common Cause and Lamone v. Benisek (2019) were decided together on June 27, 2019, where a 5-4 majority concluded partisan gerrymandering was a political question and nonjusticiable by federal courts.

Private military contractors 
In the case of Ghane v. Mid-South (January 16, 2014), the Mississippi Supreme Court held that a wrongful death action against a private military company by the family of a deceased United States Navy SEAL could proceed under Mississippi law since the plaintiff's claims did not present a non-justiciable political question under Baker v. Carr (1962).

Court cases
Important cases discussing the political question doctrine:
Marbury v. Madison,  – the origin of the phrase.
 Luther v. Borden,  – Guarantee of a republican form of government is a political question to be resolved by the President and the Congress.
 Coleman v. Miller,  – Mode of amending federal Constitution is a political question.
 Colegrove v. Green,  – Apportionment of Congressional districts is a political question (Overruled by Baker v. Carr).
 Baker v. Carr,  – Apportionment of state legislatures is not a political question.
 Powell v. McCormack,  – Congressional authority to exclude members who have met qualifications to serve is not a political question.
 Goldwater v. Carter,  – Presidential authority to terminate treaties is a political question.
 INS v. Chadha,  – Constitutionality of one house legislative veto is not a political question.
 Nixon v. United States,  – Senate authority to try impeachments and impeachment are political questions.
 Rucho v. Common Cause, (2019) – Partisan gerrymandering is a political question.

Beyond the United States
The political question doctrine has also had significance beyond American constitutional law.

France 
A type of act by the French government, the acte de gouvernement, avoids judicial review as it is too politically sensitive. While the scope of the concept has been reduced over time, there are still acts that the courts do not have jurisdiction over, such as matters that are deemed to be unseverable from France's diplomatic acts, like the President's decision to conduct tests of nuclear weapons or to sever financial aid to Iraq. Other acts include the President's decision to dissolve Parliament, award honors, or grant amnesty. Such actes de gouvernement need to be politically-based and also concern domains in which the courts are not competent to judge, e.g. national security and international relations.

Japan 
The postwar constitution gave the Supreme Court of Japan the power of judicial review, and the court developed its own political question doctrine (tōchikōi). The Supreme Court of Japan was in part trying to avoid deciding the merits of cases under Article 9 of the post-war pacifist constitution, which renounces war and the threat or use of force.  Issues arising under Art. 9 include the legitimacy of Japan's Self-Defense Force, the U.S.-Japan Security Treaty, and the stationing of U.S. Forces in Japan.

The Sunagawa case is considered the leading precedent on the political question doctrine in Japan. In 1957, in what was later known as the "Sunagawa incident," demonstrators entered a then U.S. military base in the Tokyo suburb of Sunagawa. By their entry into the base, demonstrators violated a special Japanese criminal law based on the U.S.-Japan Security Treaty. A Tokyo District Court found that the U.S. military's presence in Japan were unconstitutional under Art. 9 of the Constitution and acquitted the defendants.

The Supreme Court overturned the district court in a fast-track appeal, implicitly developing the political question doctrine in the ruling. The Court found it inappropriate for the judiciary to judge the constitutionality of highly political matters like the U.S.-Japan Security Treaty, unless they expressly violate the Constitution. On the Security Treaty, the Court saw "an extremely high degree of political consideration" and "there is a certain element of incompatibility in the process of judicial determination of its constitutionality by a court of law which has as its mission the exercise of the purely judicial function." It therefore found that the question should be resolved by the Cabinet, the Diet, and ultimately by the people through elections. The presence of U.S. forces, moreover, did not violate Article 9 of the pacifist Constitution, because it did not involve forces under Japanese command.

Thereafter, the political question doctrine became a barrier for challenges under Art. 9. Under the "clear mistake" rule developed by the Court, it defers to the political branches on Art. 9 issues so long as the act is "not obviously unconstitutional and void."

Other notable cases on the political question doctrine in Japan include the Tomabechi case, which concerned whether the dissolution of the Diet was valid. In the Tomabechi case, the Court also decided against judicial review by implicitly invoking the political question doctrine, citing the separation of powers as justification. In addition, the Court announced that in political question cases not related to Art. 9, the clear mistake rule does not apply and judicial review is categorically prohibited.

Switzerland
In 2007, the Republic of China filed a lawsuit before a Swiss civil court against the International Organization for Standardization, arguing that the ISO's use of the United Nations name "Taiwan, Province of China" rather than "Republic of China (Taiwan)" violated Taiwan's name rights. On 9 September 2010, a panel of the Federal Supreme Court of Switzerland decided, by three votes to two, to dismiss the suit as presenting a political question not subject to Swiss civil jurisdiction.

Taiwan
The Judicial Yuan on 26 November 1993 interpreted that the delimitation of national territory would be a significant political question beyond the reach of judicial review.

International Court of Justice, and the European Court of Human Rights

In international courts, the International Court of Justice has dealt with the doctrine in its advisory function, and the European Court of Human Rights has engaged with the doctrine through the margin of appreciation.

Court of Justice of the European Union
Within European Union law, the Court of Justice of the European Union has never explicitly addressed the political question doctrine in its jurisprudence, yet it has been argued that there are traces of the doctrine present in its rulings.

References

Further reading

 Piazolo, Michael: Verfassungsgerichtsbarkeit und politische Fragen, die Political Question Doktrin im Verfahren vor dem Bundesverfassungsgericht und dem Supreme Court der USA. Munich 1994 (german text)

Civil procedure
Legal doctrines and principles